Haafiz Shahid Yaqoob (Urdu: حافظ شاہد یعقوب) (born 10 May 1963) is a former Pakistani cricketer who played three One Day Internationals in 1988. He plays domestic tournament by WAPDA. He was right arm fast medium bowler. He makes his international debut in 1988.

References 

 
 

1963 births
Lahore City Blues cricketers
Lahore City cricketers
Living people
Pakistan One Day International cricketers
Pakistani cricketers
Cricketers from Lahore
Water and Power Development Authority cricketers